Jaime Ornelas Camacho (28 February 1921 – 24 February 2016) was a Portuguese politician. He was the first President of the Regional Government of Madeira and a member of the Madeiran branch of the centre-right Social Democratic Party. In 1978 he was forced out of office and succeeded by Alberto João Jardim, who remained President of the Regional Government of Madeira until 2015.

National Orders
  Commander of the Order of Merit (9 June 1993)
  Grand Cross of the Order of Prince Henry (28 June 2001)

References

External links
 Madeira-edu.pt 
 Web.archive.org

1921 births
2016 deaths
Grand Crosses of the Order of Prince Henry
People from Câmara de Lobos
Commanders of the Order of Merit (Portugal)
Presidents of the Regional Government of Madeira
Social Democratic Party (Portugal) politicians
20th-century Portuguese politicians